The Songs of David Byrne and Brian Eno Tour is a 2008–2009 promotional concert tour of music co-written by David Byrne and Brian Eno with performances by Byrne. In addition to being a retrospective of the duo's collaborations, the tour promoted the album Everything That Happens Will Happen Today. The musical performers were accompanied by dancers who were choreographed to several songs. Performances were held across the world and later documented on a tour EP and a concert film.

Material
Byrne assembled a band to tour for the album, performing music throughout the latter half of 2008 and early 2009 across North America, Europe, and Australasia. He hired more singers than he had on previous tours to reproduce the complex vocal harmonies of the album and was inspired to bring along dancers after seeing Sufjan Stevens promote the album Illinois as well as the Japanese films Funky Forest and The Taste of Tea. Byrne was initially uninvolved in the choreography, but made more suggestions as the tour went on and after he saw a live performance by Deerhoof that incorporated dancing with instruments. He began booking tour dates before the album was completed and continued writing his book The Bicycle Diaries throughout the tour.

In planning the set lists for the tour, Byrne initially considered only promoting this album, but decided to assemble songs this album as well as their previous collaborations, including the Talking Heads albums More Songs About Buildings and Food, Fear of Music, and Remain in Light and Byrne's The Catherine Wheel soundtrack. By playing music from all of their collaborations, Byrne hoped to "draw a line linking this new material with what we did 30 years ago" with the goal of clarifying the connection between all of the duo's previous work. In reviewing the music, he found that "[t]here might be more continuity than I imagined, which I hope is going to work in my favor." Although he was invited to participate and early reports indicated that would, Eno chose to not tour, letting Byrne decide how to present this music live.

A month after releasing the album, Byrne was skeptical of market saturation, claiming "I sense that a lot of people don't know we have a record out" and hoped to counterbalance that ignorance with this tour. At the same time, the main goal of the performance was not promotion but the show itself.

Set lists
The set list for the first night:

Set
"Strange Overtones" (originally from Everything That Happens Will Happen Today)
"I Zimbra" (Fear of Music)
"One Fine Day" (Everything That Happens Will Happen Today)
"Help Me Somebody" (My Life in the Bush of Ghosts)
"Houses in Motion" (Remain in Light)
"My Big Nurse" (Everything That Happens Will Happen Today)
"My Big Hands (Fall Through the Cracks)" (The Catherine Wheel)
"Heaven" (Fear of Music)
"Home" (Everything That Happens Will Happen Today)
"The River" (Everything That Happens Will Happen Today)
"Crosseyed and Painless" (Remain in Light)
"Life Is Long" (Everything That Happens Will Happen Today)
"Once In a Lifetime" (Remain in Light)
"Life During Wartime" (Fear of Music)
"I Feel My Stuff" (Everything That Happens Will Happen Today)

Encore
"Take Me to the River" (More Songs About Buildings and Food)
"The Great Curve" (Remain in Light)

Second encore
"Everything That Happens" (Everything That Happens Will Happen Today)

By the time he reached St. Louis in mid-October, the following set was played:

Set
"Strange Overtones"
"I Zimbra"
"One Fine Day"
"Help Me Somebody"
"Houses in Motion"
"My Big Nurse"
"My Big Hands (Fall Through the Cracks)"
"Heaven"
"Never Thought" (originally from the deluxe edition of Everything That Happens Will Happen Today)
"The River"
"Crosseyed and Painless"
"Life Is Long"
"Once In a Lifetime"
"Life During Wartime"
"I Feel My Stuff"

Encore
"Take Me to the River"
"The Great Curve"

Second encore
"Air" (Fear of Music)
"Burning Down the House" (Speaking in Tongues)
"Everything That Happens"

Midway through this leg, Byrne expanded some shows to have three encores, such as Omaha, Indianapolis, Toronto, and Raleigh. The first was as listed above, the second was "Don't Worry About the Government" and "Burning Down the House", and the third was "Everything That Happens". He also played this extended encore at the Hong Kong and Sydney shows. Byrne expanded his February 28, 2009, show to contain four two-song encores.

Musicians and technical personnel

Performers

Byrne has assembled the following musicians and dancers to accompany him:
David Byrne – voice and guitar
Mark De Gli Antoni – keyboards
Paul Frazier – bass guitar
Graham Hawthorne – drums
Mauro Refosco – percussion
Redray Frazier – background vocals
Kaïssa – background vocals
Jenni Muldaur – background vocals
Lily Baldwin – dancing
Natalie Kuhn – dancing
Steven Reker – dancing

Refosco previously toured with Byrne's My Backwards Life band in support of Grown Backwards; like bassist Paul Frazier he also appears on Look into the Eyeball, Grown Backwards, Live from Austin, Texas, and Everything That Happens Will Happen Today. The performers started rehearsals the day that the album was released and continued to rehearse more for this tour than is typical for other Byrne presentations. All performers dress alike in cream-colored jumpsuits and overalls. The dancers have choreographed for seven songs and the entire ensemble performed together for the first time on September 9.

Technical crew
Mark Edwards – production manager
Keith Anderson – tour manager
Bruce Knight – Front of House
Mike Lafferty – stage and keyboard technician
Victor Muñoz – guitar technician
Don FitzSimmonds – drum technician
Jeremy Bolton and Michael Conners – PA technicians
Bob Lewis – monitors
Jon Pollak – lighting designer/director
Martin Garnish – lighting
Abi Lester – wardrobe

The equipment was engineered by Clair Global and included gear from Lab.gruppen, TC Electronic, and Yamaha.

Choreographers
Noémie Lafrance
Annie-B Parson
Sonya Robbins and Layla Childs aka Robbinschilds Dance

Supporting acts
There were only a handful of dates that included other performers and no opening act was scheduled throughout the tour. Ani DiFranco opened on June 2, 2009, and Byrne played a double bill with Marianne Faithfull opening on July 30, 2009. The Extra Action Marching Band guested on "Burning Down the House" and "Road to Nowhere" on the October 7, 2008, and June 23, 24, and 26, 2009, dates. DeVotchka opened on some 2009 dates.

Tour dates
The tour was expected to run six months into spring 2009, including dates in Australia and Europe before finally concluding after 11 months with five legs worldwide:

†Date scheduled and later canceled

Everything That Happens Will Happen on This Tour 

Everything That Happens Will Happen on This Tour – David Byrne on Tour: Songs of David Byrne and Brian Eno is a 2009 live EP released by David Byrne recorded during the Songs of David Byrne and Brian Eno Tour. The album is composed of live recordings of three songs from the 2009 Byrne/Eno collaboration Everything That Happens Will Happen Today and one—"Help Me Somebody"—from their 1981 album My Life in the Bush of Ghosts.

Recording and release
Byrne was approached by Amnesty International to get involved in his tour. For years, Byrne had performed one date on his tours as a benefit and decided to record this EP with proceeds from sales benefiting the organization.

Byrne's band performed with an audio system that could professionally record every show based around Pro Tools. Byrne had these recordings mixed by Patrick Dillett—who was also responsible for engineering on Everything That Happens Will Happen Today.

The album was made available digitally in the form of DRM-free 320 kbit/s MP3s with the option of a FLAC as well. Like Everything That Happens Will Happen Today, the EP was marketed with Internet startup Topspin Media.

The album received a positive review from The Village Voice, calling it "cheerful" and "lovely."

Track listing
All songs written by David Byrne and Brian Eno; "Strange Overtones" co-written by Leo Abrahams.
"Strange Overtones" – 4:37
"Help Me Somebody" – 3:28
"One Fine Day" – 4:34
"I Feel My Stuff" – 6:29

Personnel
David Byrne – vocals and guitar
Mark De Gli Antoni – keyboards
Paul Frazier – bass guitar
Redray Frazier – background vocals
Graham Hawthorne – drums
Kaïssa – background vocals
Jenni Muldaur – background vocals
Mauro Refosco – percussion

Ride, Rise, Roar

On February 11, 2010, it was announced that a documentary film entitled Ride, Rise, Roar chronicling the tour would be released to the 2010 film festival circuit. The debut with be at South by Southwest on March 15, 2010, where it will be screened in all three media categories—film, interactive, and music. The film was the feature-length directorial debut by Hillman Curtis—who also worked on the short film that accompanies the deluxe edition of Everything That Happens Will Happen Today. The film includes concert footage, footage of the planning and rehearsals for the tour, and exclusive interviews with Byrne, Eno, and the supporting musicians and dancers. Curtis was initially contacted to document the tour with no clear objective for the film and decided to focus on the collaboration between Byrne and his tour mates as well as the unique challenge of combining popular music with modern dance.

Stalking incident
While on tour, dancer Lily Baldwin started receiving letters from a stalker following the show in Europe. She turned her experience into the 2017 film Glass and began a website offering resources for those who are being stalked.

See also

Ballet
Modern dance

References

External links

Tour dates from Byrne's site
Press from Byrne's site
Tour journal
Photo gallery from Pitchfork Media
Byrne performing on The Colbert Report
Amnesty International

2008 concert tours
2009 concert tours
David Byrne concert tours
Brian Eno